Domingo Félix Andújar José (born May 2, 1965 in Santo Domingo, Dominican Republic) is a former professional baseball outfielder. He played in Major League Baseball for the Oakland Athletics, St. Louis Cardinals, Kansas City Royals, New York Yankees and Arizona Diamondbacks between 1988 and 2003. In an 11-season Major League career, José posted a .280 batting average with 54 home runs and 324 RBI in 747 games played. In four seasons in the KBO League, José posted a .309 batting average with 95 homers and 314 RBI in 394 games.
 
During his time in Oakland, the Athletics appeared in three straight World Series; while he was not on the postseason roster in any of those years, José was awarded a World Series ring for the team's 1989 series win.

José was selected to the National League All-Star team in 1991 with the Cardinals. He was the National League Player of the Month in April 1991 and May 1992.

José played in the Dominican Professional Baseball League with Tigres del Licey until the 1997–98 season, having debuted in the 1986–87 season and hitting 14 home runs before being transferred to Estrellas Orientales, and with this club he set a league record on November 19, 2005, when he hit his 60th home run.

He last played in 2009 for the Schaumburg Flyers of the Northern League, and was leading the league in batting average in June.

He was inducted into the Dominican Republic Hall of Fame in 2015.

In January 2017 José was selected as the "Star" coach of America's Next Top Baseball Players, a reality television series focusing on finding undiscovered raw talent in the Dominican Republic.

References

External links

1965 births
Acereros de Monclova players
Arizona Diamondbacks players
Calgary Vipers players
Columbus Clippers players
Diablos Rojos del México players
Dominican Republic expatriate baseball players in Canada
Dominican Republic expatriate baseball players in Mexico
Dominican Republic expatriate baseball players in South Korea
Dominican Republic expatriate baseball players in the United States
Ganaderos de Tabasco players
Guerreros de Oaxaca players
Huntsville Stars players
Idaho Falls A's players
Iowa Cubs players
Kansas City Royals players
KBO League designated hitters
Lancaster Barnstormers players

Lincoln Saltdogs players
Living people
Lotte Giants players
Louisville Redbirds players
Madison Muskies players
Major League Baseball players from the Dominican Republic
Major League Baseball right fielders
Mexican League baseball right fielders
Memphis Chicks players
Modesto A's players
Nashua Pride players
National League All-Stars
New York Yankees players
Oakland Athletics players
Olmecas de Tabasco players
Pawtucket Red Sox players
Pericos de Puebla players
Schaumburg Flyers players
Sportspeople from Santo Domingo
St. Louis Cardinals players
St. Petersburg Cardinals players
Syracuse Chiefs players
Tacoma Tigers players